Human Love is the fifth studio album by British singer-songwriter Newton Faulkner. It was released on 20 November 2015 through BMG.

Promotion
The album was promoted by a cover of Major Lazer's song "Get Free", which was released as the lead single on 27 November 2015. A music video for the song, in which Faulkner cuts off his trademark dreadlocks to mark a beginning of a new chapter in his career, was released on 15 September 2015.

Critical reception

Writing for Renowned for Sound, Brandon Veevers awarded Human Love five out of five stars and commented that the album was "easily [Faulkner's] finest work since his debut album," Hand Built by Robots (2007). "Human Love showcases Faulkner as a gifted guitarist, a versatile performer and a truly sublime vocalist with an unrivaled songwriting talent. Moving effortlessly between somber ballads like the minimalist 'Break' and the eclectic and quirky 'Can I Be Enough' through to world-scented toe tappers like 'Up Up and Away' and 'Far to Fall', Faulkner has raised the bar yet again and delivered a truly exceptional collection."

In a mixed review for the London Evening Standard, Andre Paine noted that "Faulkner emerged as a rootsy songwriter ... and that energy is intact on the clattering 'Up Up and Away', the blues-pop of 'Stay and Take' and the world music rhythms of 'Far to Fall'," however, the albums was "polished but occasionally forgettable."

Track listing

Personnel
Newton Faulkner – lead vocals, guitar
Tessa Rose Jackson – vocals (track 5)

Technical personnel
Cenzo Townshend – mixing
Cam Blackwood – production (track 3)
Empire of the Sun – production (track 10)

Charts

References

2015 albums
Newton Faulkner albums